Atul Singh Surwar is an Indian cricketer. He made his Twenty20 debut for Jharkhand in the 2017–18 Zonal T20 League on 16 January 2018. He made his List A debut for Jharkhand in the 2017–18 Vijay Hazare Trophy on 5 February 2018.

References

External links
 

Year of birth missing (living people)
Living people
Indian cricketers
Place of birth missing (living people)
Jharkhand cricketers